Marcel Maltritz (born 2 October 1978) is a German retired professional footballer who played as a centre-back.

Career

1. FC Magdeburg
On 2 October 1978, Maltritz was born in Magdeburg (then East Germany). He first played for TuS Magdeburg-Neustadt (until 1986) and then joined the 1. FC Magdeburg. He played for this club from 1986 until 1998. 1. FC Magdeburg played on the highest level in the GDR but after the German reunification the club finished 10th in the final season of the DDR-Oberliga and was thus only qualified for the NOFV-Oberliga Mitte on the third level of the reunified German league pyramid. When Maltritz left the club in December 1998 they played in the Regionalliga. At the end of the season 1. FC Magdeburg was relegated to the fourth level.

VfL Wolfsburg
The VfL Wolfsburg was newly promoted to the Bundesliga when Maltritz joined the club in the winter break 1998–99. Wolfsburg, financially supported by Volkswagen, developed very well and even reached the third round of the UEFA Cup in the 1999–2000 season. At the end of the 2000–01 season Maltritz left the club and went to Hamburger SV.

Hamburger SV
Hamburger SV is one of the traditional major clubs in the Bundesliga. In the 2002–03 season the club from the north finished fourth and qualified for the 2003–04 UEFA Cup. On 28 July 2003, Maltritz won his first major trophy: the 2003 German League Cup. At the end of the 2003–04 season Maltritz moved to VfL Bochum.

VfL Bochum
The VfL Bochum had just finished its most successful season with a fifth place and qualification to the UEFA Cup when Maltritz joined the club. But the club was eliminated in the first round of the 2004–05 UEFA Cup by Standard Liège and even relegated to the 2. Bundesliga at the end of the season. Maltritz stayed loyal to his club and helped Bochum to promote directly back to the highest level. In the 2006–07 season VfL Bochum finished at the eighth place, which was the third best Bundesliga result in club history.

Career statistics

Honours
Hamburger SV
DFL-Ligapokal: 2003

References

External links
 

1978 births
Living people
German footballers
1. FC Magdeburg players
VfL Wolfsburg players
Hamburger SV players
Hamburger SV II players
VfL Bochum players
VfL Bochum II players
Germany under-21 international footballers
Germany B international footballers
Bundesliga players
2. Bundesliga players
Association football defenders
Association football midfielders
Sportspeople from Magdeburg